Francisco das Chagas Rodrigues de Brito (born 1964) is a Brazilian former miner, informal mechanic, serial killer and sex offender condemned by the courts as responsible for several homicides against children in the state of Maranhão, maintaining the abuse of the corpse and emasculation of the victims in common. Scientific evidence proved him as the perpetrator of the crimes when experts found several bodies in his residence, as well as limbs and fragments of children who had disappeared. Evidence points him as the real person responsible for the series of crimes of the same modus operandi that occurred in the municipality of Altamira, in Pará, since the accused lived in the region for more than 10 years. Francisco das Chagas Rodrigues de Brito is considered one of the most prolific serial killers in the country.

Crimes

The case of poor children being killed in the capital city of São Luís was brought to light in 2004 with the murder of minor Jonahtan dos Santos, who, before disappearing, had said that he would meet with the mechanic. The suspect was arrested on suspicion of killing Jonahtan and 16 other boys, leading investigators to murders dating back from 1997, also in the municipalities of Paço do Lumiar and São José de Ribamar. Two bones were also found on the grounds of the house in which he lived.

The lack of clarification on these homicides, carelessly treated for over the years, led Brazil to be denounced by organizations at the Inter-American Court of Human Rights, of the OAS.

Francisco das Chagas Rodrigues de Brito's crimes also extended to the state of Pará, with a suspected total of 42 children being killed and emasculated.

In his crimes, the murderer, who exhibited psychopathic characteristics (sought to justify himself, lacked pity and lied), sexually abused his victims and, after killing them, mutilated them by cutting off their ears, fingers and then emasculating them.

See also
Anísio Ferreira de Sousa
List of serial killers by country
List of serial killers by number of victims

References

1965 births
Brazilian murderers of children
Brazilian rapists
Brazilian serial killers
Living people
Male serial killers